"Russians" is a song by Sting, from his debut solo album, The Dream of the Blue Turtles, released in June 1985, and released as a single in November. The song is a commentary and plea that criticises the then-dominant Cold War foreign policy and doctrine of mutual assured destruction (MAD) by the United States and the then existing Soviet Union.

Background
In 2010, Sting explained that the song was inspired by watching Soviet TV via inventor Ken Schaffer's satellite receiver at Columbia University:

I had a friend at university who invented a way to steal the satellite signal from Russian TV. We'd have a few beers and climb this tiny staircase to watch Russian television... At that time of night we'd only get children's Russian television, like their "Sesame Street". I was impressed with the care and attention they gave to their children's programmes. I regret our current enemies haven't got the same ethics.

Sting performed the song at the 1986 Grammy Awards.  His performance of the song was released on the 1994 album Grammy's Greatest Moments Volume 1.

Music video
The accompanying music video for the single was directed by Jean-Baptiste Mondino, and was shot in a similar black-and-white, French New Wave-influenced style to his previous video for Don Henley's "The Boys of Summer". The video also prominently featured child actor Felix Howard, who was later featured Mondino's promotional video for Madonna's "Open Your Heart" in 1986.

Composition 
The song uses the Romance theme from the Lieutenant Kijé Suite by Russian composer Sergei Prokofiev, and its lead-in includes a snippet from the Soviet news program Vremya in which the famed Soviet news broadcaster Igor Kirillov says in Russian: "...The British Prime Minister described the talks with the head of the delegation, Mikhail Sergeyevich Gorbachev, as a constructive, realistic, practical and friendly exchange of opinions...", referring to the meeting of Mikhail Gorbachev and Margaret Thatcher in 1984. The Soviet leader at the time was Konstantin Chernenko.

Also in the background, communications from the Apollo–Soyuz mission can be heard.

Reception
Cash Box said it "features a haunting melody, dramatic lyric and sensational musicianship."  Billboard called it a "a sober political/humanitarian message framed in surging chords and Prokofiev quotes."

Legacy 
In a 2021 interview, James Cameron, the co-writer, director and producer of Terminator 2, said that the song inspired him to create the character of John Connor, the 10-year-old boy who would be the central character of the plot: "I remember sitting there once, high on E, writing notes for Terminator, and I was struck by Sting’s song, that “I hope the Russians love their children too.” And I thought, “You know what? The idea of a nuclear war is just so antithetical to life itself.” That’s where the kid came from."

Sting re-recorded an acoustic version of the song in March 2022, during the 2022 Russian invasion of Ukraine, with proceeds going to humanitarian and medical aid in Ukraine. In a statement, he said that he "never thought [the song] would be relevant again. But, in the light of one man’s bloody and woefully misguided decision to invade a peaceful, unthreatening neighbor, the song is, once again, a plea for our common humanity."

Track listings
 7″ single
 "Russians" – 3:57
 "Gabriel's Message" – 2:15

 12″ maxi
 "Russians" – 3:57
 "Gabriel's Message" – 2:10
 "I Burn for You" (live) – 4:40

Personnel

 Photography by Anton Corbijn
 Made in West Germany by Polygram

 "Russians"
 Written by Sting
 Engineered by Jim Scott
 Produced by Pete Smith

 "Gabriel's Message"
 Written by Traditional
 Arranged by Sting
 Mixed and recorded by Pete Smith

 "I Burn for You"
 Written by Sting
 Mixed, recorded and produced by Pete Smith

Charts

Weekly charts

Year-end charts

Certifications

See also
 Do the Russians Want War?
 Music and politics
 Nuclear strategy
 Ronald Reagan in music
 American University speech

References

External links
 "Sting: Russians' 1985"—analysis of the song on Pop History Dig by Jack Doyle, PopHistoryDig.com, 30 April 2009

1985 singles
1985 songs
A&M Records singles
Anti-war songs
Black-and-white music videos
Cold War in popular culture
Cultural depictions of Nikita Khrushchev
Music videos directed by Jean-Baptiste Mondino
Popular songs based on classical music
Rock ballads
Songs about nuclear war and weapons
Songs about Ronald Reagan
Songs about Russia
Songs written by Sting (musician)
Sting (musician) songs